(born 2 July 1992) is a Japanese former speed skater who is a member of the Nidec Sankyo speed skating team.

Career
Takagi has won a pair of silver medals at the World Junior Speed Skating Championships, in two team pursuit events.

She made her World Cup debut in November 2013. As of September 2014, Takagi has one World Cup podium finish, as part of the Japanese team pursuit squad at Heerenveen in 2013–14. Her best individual finish is 5th in a 5000 m race at Astana in 2013–14. Her best overall finish in the World Cup is 14th, in the 2013–14 mass start.

Takagi competed at the 2014 Winter Olympics for Japan. In the 1500 metres she placed 32nd. She was also part of the Japanese team pursuit squad, which won their semi-final, before losing to the Netherlands in the semi-final and to Russia in the bronze medal final, ending up 4th overall.

In 2015 Nana Takagi became a world champion, when in the 2015 World Single Distance Championships she won the gold medal in the team pursuit where she participated together with her sister Miho Takagi and compatriot Ayaka Kikuchi.

In 2018, Takagi was part of the Japanese team that won the Olympics women team pursuit gold medal.  Takagi won a second gold medal at the 2018 Olympics in the Women's mass start event.

World Cup podiums

See also
 List of world records in speed skating
 World record progression team pursuit speed skating women
 List of Olympic records in speed skating
 List of multiple Olympic gold medalists at a single Games

References

External links

1992 births
Living people
Japanese female speed skaters
Speed skaters at the 2014 Winter Olympics
Speed skaters at the 2018 Winter Olympics
Speed skaters at the 2022 Winter Olympics
Olympic speed skaters of Japan
Speed skaters at the 2017 Asian Winter Games
Asian Games medalists in speed skating
Medalists at the 2017 Asian Winter Games
Asian Games gold medalists for Japan
Sportspeople from Hokkaido
Medalists at the 2018 Winter Olympics
Medalists at the 2022 Winter Olympics
Olympic medalists in speed skating
Olympic gold medalists for Japan
Olympic silver medalists for Japan
World Single Distances Speed Skating Championships medalists
20th-century Japanese women
21st-century Japanese women